Gigi Gryce is an eponymous album by American jazz saxophonist Gigi Gryce, recorded in 1958 and released on the MetroJazz label.

Reception

AllMusic awarded the album 3 stars, stating: "A fine mainstream date, but probably long gone."

Track listing
 "In a Sentimental Mood"  (Duke Ellington, Irving Mills, Manny Kurtz) - 3:35
 "Blues March" (Benny Golson) - 3:03   
 "Seabreeze" (Larry Douglas, Fred Norman, Romare Bearden) - 2:30  
 "Bangoon" (Hank Jones) - 2:43  
 "It Don't Mean a Thing" (Ellington, Mills) - 3:16  
 "Cold Breeze" (Wade Legge) - 2:36
 "Rich and Creamy" (Jack Lazare) - 3:29   
 "My Ideal" (Richard Whiting, Newell Chase, Leo Robin) - 2:48    
 "Baba's Blues" (Gigi Gryce) - 2:59  
 "Little Susan" (Randy Weston) - 2:29
 "Lullaby for Milkman" (Lazare) - 2:30
 "Somewhere" (Ray Copeland) - 2:36

Personnel 
Gigi Gryce - alto saxophone, tenor saxophone, baritone saxophone, clarinet, piccolo, flute 
Hank Jones - piano, celeste
Milt Hinton - bass
Osie Johnson - drums

References 

1958 albums
Gigi Gryce albums
MetroJazz Records albums